WriteOnline is an online word processor from Crick Software that incorporates writing support tools and is designed for schools and colleges.

Features
WriteOnline is a WYSIWYG, page-view word processor which includes software speech, word prediction, Wordbars and a graphic organiser.

WriteOnline includes features to make it accessible for users with visual impairments, and also includes a switch accessible onscreen keyboard for users unable to use a standard keyboard.

WriteOnline is a Java application. It is available in UK English and US English.

See also
 Word processors
 List of word processors

References
 The Guardian, December 2007
 Java Dukes Choice Awards 2008
 English Speaking Union President's Award 2008
 Educational Resources Awards 2009

External links
 WriteOnline product page

Assistive technology